A list of films produced in Italy in 1912 (see 1912 in film):

External links
 Italian films of 1912 at the Internet Movie Database

1912
Italian
Films